Nikola Holmes (born 18 February 1981) is a German ice hockey player. She competed in the women's tournament at the 2006 Winter Olympics.

References

1981 births
Living people
German women's ice hockey players
Olympic ice hockey players of Germany
Ice hockey players at the 2006 Winter Olympics
People from Bellflower, California
21st-century German women